Tarsolepis japonica is a species of moth of the family Notodontidae. It is found in Taiwan and Japan.

The wingspan is 63–74 mm.

The larvae feed on Acer serrulatum and Acer albopurpurascens.

References

Moths described in 1917
Notodontidae
Moths of Japan